Kabachnik is a Russian occupational surname literally meaning "innkeeper" (kabak keeper). Notable people with the surname include:
 (1908-1997), Soviet organic chemist, namesake of the Kabachnik–Fields reaction
 (born 1940), Soviet and Russian nuclear physicist, professor

Russian-language surnames
Occupational surnames